Manuel Badenes Calduch (31 October 1928 – 26 November 2007) was a Spanish footballer, who played as a forward for clubs such as FC Barcelona and Valencia CF.

Club career
Badenes started his career at CD Castellón. His first season at the club saw him score four goals in ten games which resulted in a move to Barcelona. He spent two season at the club, winning two La Liga titles before moving to Valencia.  He scored 90 goals in 97 games at Valencia before moving to Real Valladolid, where he won the Pichichi trophy awarded to the top scorer in La Liga in 1958.

International career
Badenes is the all-time top goal scorer of Spain B with 8 goals, and remarkably, he managed to achieve this feat having only two appearances for the team (a ratio of four goals per game), both at the 1953–58 Mediterranean Cup, netting four past Greece and four again against Egypt, to be crowned the tournament's top goal scorer. However, despite his prolificness for the B team, he never managed to reach the main team.

Club statistics

International goals
''Spain B score listed first, score column indicates score after each Badenes goal.

Honours

Club
FC Barcelona
Spanish League: 1947–48, 1948–49
Latin Cup: 1949
Copa Eva Duarte: 1948

Valencia CF
Spanish Cup: 1953–54

International
Spain B
Mediterranean Cup: 1953-58

Individual
Real Valladolid
Pichichi Trophy: 1957–58

Top goalscorer of the 1953-58 Mediterranean Cup with 8 goals

Records
All-time top goal scorer of Spain B with 8 goals
All-time top goal scorer of the Mediterranean Cup with 8 goals

References

External links
 
 Valencia CF profile 
 FC Barcelona profile

1928 births
2007 deaths
Sportspeople from Castellón de la Plana
Spanish footballers
Association football forwards
La Liga players
CD Castellón footballers
FC Barcelona players
Real Zaragoza players
Valencia CF players
Real Valladolid players
Sporting de Gijón players
Spain B international footballers
Pichichi Trophy winners